Tore Ellingsen (born 3 June 1962) is a Norwegian economist active in Sweden.

Ellingsen graduated as siviløkonom from Norwegian School of Economics in Bergen in 1985, and received a Ph.D. from London School of Economics in 1991. Since 1991 he is active at the Stockholm School of Economics, from 1996 as docent (associate professor) and from 2000 as professor of economics. Ellingsen was the first recipient of the Assar Lindbeck Medal.

Ellingsen was elected a foreign member of the Royal Swedish Academy of Sciences in 2004. Since 2007 he is a member of the Prize Committee for the Sveriges Riksbank Prize in Economic Sciences in Memory of Alfred Nobel, where he was an adjunct member 2005-2007. He is also a fellow of the European Economic Association.

References

External links 
Tore Ellingsen's web page at the Stockholm School of Economics

Norwegian economists
Academic staff of the Stockholm School of Economics
Norwegian School of Economics alumni
Alumni of the London School of Economics
Members of the Royal Swedish Academy of Sciences
1962 births
Living people

Fellows of the European Economic Association